Matthew Postlethwayte (1679–1745) was Archdeacon of Norwich from 1742 until 1744.

A Cumbrian, Postlethwayte was educated at St Paul's and Corpus Christi College, Cambridge.  He was ordained on 22 December 1706. He held incumbencies at Needham, Shottesham, Denton and Redenhall.

He died on 27 June 1745.

References

1745 deaths
18th-century English Anglican priests
People educated at St Paul's School, London
Archdeacons of Norwich
Alumni of Corpus Christi College, Cambridge
People from Cumberland
1679 births